"Life of da Party" is the third single from Snoop Dogg's ninth solo album Ego Trippin'. It features Too Short and Mistah F.A.B. and was produced by Scoop DeVille. It peaked at #5 on the Bubbling Under Hot 100 Singles chart, making it Mistah F.A.B.'s most successful single to date.

Track listing
Digital download
 «Life of da Party»  — 4:23

CD single
 «Life Of Da Party (Radio Version With Snoop Intro Clean)»  − 4:23
 «Life Of Da Party (With Snoop Intro Dirty)»  − 4:23
 «Life Of Da Party (Instrumental)»  − 4:23

Music video
On a track the clip was shot from Too Short and Mistah F.A.B. The music video was featured on the BET show, 106 & Park, as a New Joint on March 11, 2008.

Charts

References

Songs about parties
2008 singles
Snoop Dogg songs
Too Short songs
Mistah F.A.B. songs
Song recordings produced by Scoop DeVille
Songs written by Snoop Dogg
2007 songs
Songs written by Too Short
Songs written by Scoop DeVille